= Journal of the Australian Early Medieval Association =

- Discipline: Medieval studies
- Language: English
- Edited by: Geoffrey Dunn

Publication details
- History: 2005-present
- Publisher: Australian Early Medieval Association (Australia)
- Frequency: Annually

Standard abbreviations
- ISO 4: J. Aust. Early Mediev. Assoc.

Indexing
- ISSN: 1449-9320
- OCLC no.: 465698294

Links
- Journal homepage; Online access

The Journal of the Australian Early Medieval Association is an annual peer-reviewed academic journal published by the Australian Early Medieval Association. It covers research on the early Middle Ages, broadly defined as the period from the late Roman Empire to the Norman Conquest (roughly 400 CE to 1100 CE). It examines art history, archaeology, literature, linguistics, music, and theology, and from any interpretive angle – memory, gender, historiography, medievalism, and consilience. It was established in 2005 and the editor-in-chief is Geoffrey D. Dunn (Australian Catholic University). The journal is abstracted and indexed in Scopus.
